AT or at may refer to:

Geography

Austria
 Austria (ISO 2-letter country code)
 .at, Internet country code top-level domain

United States
 Atchison County, Kansas (county code)
 The Appalachian Trail (A.T.), a 2,180+ mile long mountainous trail in the Eastern United States

Elsewhere
 Anguilla (World Meteorological Organization country code)
 Ashmore and Cartier Islands (FIPS 10-4 territory code, and obsolete NATO country code) 
 At, Bihar, village in Aurangabad district of Bihar, India
 Province of Asti, Italy (ISO 3166-2:IT code)

Politics 
 Awami Tahreek a left-wing Pakistani political party

Science and technology

Computing 
 @ (or "at sign"), the punctuation symbol now typically used in e-mail addresses and tweets)
 at (command), used to schedule tasks or other commands to be performed or run at a certain time
 IBM Personal Computer/AT
 AT (form factor) for motherboards and computer cases
 AT connector, a five-pin DIN connector for a keyboard
 The Hayes command set for computer modems (each command begins with the character string "AT")

Biology and medicine
 Anaerobic threshold, in physiology
 Análisis transaccional (Spanish for "transactional analysis"), a psychological method
 Antithrombin, a small protein molecule
 Ataxia–telangiectasia, an immunodeficiency disorder
 Athletic training

Physics and chemistry
 Astatine (symbol At), a chemical element
 Ampere-turn (symbol At), an International System of Units (MKS) unit of magnetomotive force
 Attotesla, 10−18 tesla, an SI derived unit of magnetic flux density
 Technical atmosphere (symbol at), a physical unit of pressure

Other uses in science and technology
 Acceptance testing, in engineering
 Appropriate technology, an ideological movement to scale technology to be appropriate to its context
 Assistive technology, devices for people with disabilities
 AT Protocol, a decentralized social network protocol by Bluesky
 Anti-tank warfare
 Automatic transmission, in vehicles

Other uses
 At, a preposition
 At (cuneiform), a cuneiform sign
 At, 1/100 of a Lao kip, a unit of currency
 Aarne–Thompson classification system, used to classify folktales
 Archive Team, a digital preservation group
 Aliança da Terra, a Brazilian non-governmental organization
 Alternative Tentacles, an independent record label
 Auckland Transport, New Zealand, a public transport agency
 Autolinee Toscane, Italy, a public transport agency
 Aviation electronics technician (United States Navy), a job specialty
 Royal Air Maroc (IATA airline designator AT)

See also

 
 
 
 AT1 (disambiguation)
 ATS (disambiguation)

hu:IBM-kompatibilis PC#Az AT szabvány